Carnegiella schereri, a species of freshwater hatchetfish, is native to the Amazon Basin in Peru and Brazil. It is often sold for home aquariums as silver hatchetfish, dwarf hatchetfish, or Scherer's hatchetfish, and grows to about 2.6 centimeters (1 inch).

Named in honor of William G. Scherer, an Evangelical Missionary at Pebas, Peru, who collected the type specimen and shared his collection of fishes from the Peruvian Amazon.

References

Gasteropelecidae
Taxa named by Augustín Fernández-Yépez
Fish described in 1950
Fish of Peru
Fish of Brazil